Jeffrey Mead Kurzon (born 1976) is a New York City attorney and politician.

Education 
Kurzon graduated from McGill University Faculty of Law with a BCL/LLB in 2003, after studying abroad at the University of Aix-Marseille in France.

Career
He began his career as a lawyer at Sidley Austin, which he later left to create his own law firm.

Kurzon's firm represented law school graduates who sued in a class action their law schools, including New York Law School and Cooley Law School, for misrepresenting their post-graduate employment statistics to lure students to take on hundreds of thousands dollars in debt.

Kurzon was the lead attorney who filed a lawsuit representing a class of about 9,000 unpaid Huffington Post bloggers, claiming that the Huffington Post and its acquirer AOL unjustly made profits by using the unpaid writers' work.

Political career
Kurzon became involved in New York City politics in 2007 as one of the top fundraisers for Barack Obama, raising over $150,000 for the candidate and organizing one of the earliest and largest grassroots groups in New York City in support of the candidate.

2014 congressional election
In February 2013, Kurzon announced his candidacy for the Democratic nomination for New York's 7th congressional district against 22-year incumbent Nydia Velázquez. Kurzon pledged to not accept any PAC or lobbyist money, challenging Velázquez (who sits on the Financial Services Committee) to do the same. After the Federal Election Commission issued guidance on Bitcoin, Kurzon announced he would be the first candidate in New York to accept bitcoin donations from individuals.

In the June 24, 2014 primary, Kurzon lost to Velázquez by a large margin.

Election results

In October 2021, Kurzon joined Andrew Yang's Forward Party PAC team.

External links
 Ballotpedia
 "Kurzon for Congress" Campaign website

References

Living people
1976 births
Phillips Exeter Academy alumni
American people of Armenian descent
New York (state) Democrats
Candidates in the 2014 United States elections
21st-century American politicians
McGill University Faculty of Law alumni
Candidates in the 2018 United States elections